American country music artist, Tammy Wynette, has received various awards, honors and nominations for her work. This includes two accolades from the Academy of Country Music and two awards from Record World Magazine. She also received three back-to-back accolades from the Country Music Association for Top Female Vocalist. The association also nominated her 22 more times for her work. Wynette has also been given two Grammy awards for Best Female Country Vocal Performance. The Grammy's also nominated Wynette 12 additional times. Posthumously, her song "Stand by Your Man" was inducted into the Grammy Hall of Fame. Wynette has also been inducted into the Alabama Music Hall of Fame and the Country Music Hall of Fame.

Academy of Country Music Awards

!
|-
| rowspan="3"| 1969
| Tammy's Greatest Hits
| Album of the Year
| 
| align="center" rowspan="8"| 
|-
| "Stand by Your Man"
| Single Record of the Year
| 
|-
| rowspan="2"| Tammy Wynette
| rowspan="2"| Top Female Vocalist
| 
|-
| 1970
| 
|-
| rowspan="2"| 1976
| Tammy Wynette
| Top Female Vocalist of the Year
| 
|-
| Tammy Wynette and George Jones
| Top Vocal Duo
| 
|-
| 1995
| "One"
| Top Vocal Duet
| 
|-
| 2001
| Tammy Wynette
| Cliffie Stone Pioneer Award
| 
|-
|}

Alabama Music Hall of Fame

!
|-
| 1993
| Tammy Wynette
| Alabama Music Hall of Fame
| 
| align="center"| 
|-
|}

American Music Awards

!
|-
| 1974
| rowspan="2"| Tammy Wynette
| Favorite Country Female Artist
| 
| align="center"| 
|-
| 1996
| American Music Award of Merit
| 
| align="center"| 
|-
|}

Billboard Music Awards

!
|-
| rowspan="3"| 1970
| rowspan="5"| Tammy Wynette
| Best Female Vocalist 
| 
| align="center" rowspan="3"| 
|-
| Best Female Artist, Albums
| 
|-
| Best Female Artist, Singles
| 
|-
| 1971
| Best Female Artist, Albums
| 
| align="center"| 
|-
| rowspan="2"| 1972
| Best Female Artist, Albums
| 
| align="center"| 
|-
| George Jones and Tammy Wynette
| Best Duo, Album
| 
| align="center"| 
|-
| rowspan="2"| 1974
| Tammy Wynette
| Best Female Vocalist
|  
| align="center"| 
|-
| George Jones and Tammy Wynette
| Best Duo, Album
| 
| align="center"| 
|-
|}

BMI Film & TV Awards

!
|-
| 1969
| "Stand by Your Man"
| rowspan="6"| Songwriter's Citation for Achievement
| 
| align="center"| 
|-
| 1971
| "Singing My Song"
| 
| align="center"|
|-
| 1972
| "We Sure Can Love Each Other"
| 
| align="center"| 
|-
| 1973
| "Reach Out Your Hand (And Touch Somebody)"
| 
| align="center"|
|-
| 1974
| "Another Lonely Song"
| 
| align="center"| 
|-
| rowspan="2"| 1976
| rowspan="2"| "'Til I Can Make It on My Own"
| 
| align="center"|
|-
| Songwriter's Citation Achievement (Pop and Country)
| 
| align="center"| 
|-
| 1980
| "Two Story House"
| Songwriter's Citation Achievement
| 
| align="center"| 
|-
| 1986
| "'Til I Can Make It on My Own"
| rowspan="2"| Million-Air's Award
| 
| align="center" rowspan="2"| 
|-
| 1989
| "Stand by Your Man"
| 
|-
|}

British Country Music Awards

!
|-
| 1976
| Tammy Wynette
| Number One Female Vocalist of the Year
| 
| align="center"| 
|-
|}

Cashbox Awards

!
|-
| 1968
| Tammy Wynette
| Most Programmed Female Artist
| 
| align="center"| 
|-
| 1972
| rowspan="2"| George Jones and Tammy Wynette
| rowspan="2"| Top Vocal Duo
| 
| align="center"| 
|-
| 1974
| 
| align="center"|
|-
|}

Country Music Association Awards

!
|-
| rowspan="2"| 1967
| Tammy Wynette
| Female Vocalist of the Year
| 
| align="center" rowspan="25"| 
|-
| Tammy Wynette and David Houston
| Vocal Group of the Year
| 
|-
| rowspan="3"| 1968
| D-I-V-O-R-C-E
| Album of the Year
| 
|-
| Tammy Wynette
| Female Vocalist of the Year
| 
|-
| "D-I-V-O-R-C-E"
| Single of the Year
| 
|-
| rowspan="3"| 1969
| Stand by Your Man
| Album of the Year
| 
|-
| Tammy Wynette
| Female Vocalist of the Year
| 
|-
| "Stand by Your Man"
| Song of the Year
| 
|-
| 1970
| rowspan="2"| Tammy Wynette
| rowspan="2"| Female Vocalist of the Year
| 
|-
| rowspan="2"| 1971
| 
|-
| Tammy Wynette and George Jones
| Vocal Duo of the Year
| 
|-
| rowspan="2"| 1972
| Tammy Wynette
| Female Vocalist of the Year
| 
|-
| Tammy Wynette and George Jones
| Vocal Duo of the Year
| 
|-
| rowspan="2"| 1973
| Tammy Wynette
| Female Vocalist of the Year
| 
|-
| rowspan="3"| Tammy Wynette and George Jones
| rowspan="3"| Vocal Duo of the Year
| 
|-
| 1974
| 
|-
| 1975
| 
|-
| rowspan="3"| 1976
| Tammy Wynette
| Female Vocalist of the Year
| 
|-
| "'Til I Can Make It on My Own" 
| Song of the Year 
| 
|-
| rowspan="4"| Tammy Wynette and George Jones
| rowspan="4"| Vocal Duo of the Year
| 
|-
| 1977
| 
|-
| 1980
| 
|-
| 1981
| 
|-
| 1992
| Tammy Wynette and Randy Travis
| rowspan="2"| Vocal Event of the Year
| 
|-
| 1994
| Tammy Wynette, Loretta Lynn and Dolly Parton
| 
|-
|}

Country Music Hall of Fame and Museum

!
|-
| 1998
| Tammy Wynette
| Country Music Hall of Fame and Museum
| 
| align="center"| 
|-
|}

Country Song Roundup Magazine

!
|-
| 1967
| Tammy Wynette
| Most Promising Female Artist of the Year
| 
| align="center"| 
|-
|}

Grammy Awards

!
|-
| 1968
| "I Don't Wanna Play House"
| Best Country & Western Solo Vocal Performance, Female
| 
| align="center" rowspan="14"| 
|-
| 1969
| "D-I-V-O-R-C-E"
| rowspan="4"| Best Country Vocal Performance, Female
| 
|-
| 1970
| "Stand by Your Man"
| 
|-
| 1971
| "Run, Woman, Run"
| 
|-
| 1972
| "Good Lovin' (Makes It Right)"
| 
|-
| rowspan="2"| 1973
| "Take Me"
| Best Country Vocal Performance By A Duo Or Group 
| 
|-
| "My Man (Understands)"
| Best Country Vocal Performance, Female
| 
|-
| rowspan="2"| 1974
| "We're Gonna Hold On"
| Best Country Vocal Performance By A Duo Or Group 
| 
|-
| "Kids Say the Darndest Things"
| rowspan="2"| Best Country Vocal Performance, Female
| 
|-
| 1975
| "Woman to Woman"
| 
|-
| rowspan="2"| 1977
| "Golden Ring"
| Best Country Vocal Performance By A Duo Or Group 
| 
|-
| "'Til I Can Make It on My Own"
| Best Country Vocal Performance, Female
| 
|-
| 1978
| "Near You"
| Best Country Vocal Performance By A Duo Or Group 
| 
|-
| 1994
| "Silver Threads and Golden Needles"
| Best Country Vocal Collaboration 
| 
|-
| 1999
| "Stand by Your Man"
| Grammy Hall of Fame
| 
| align="center"| 
|-
|}

Music City News Awards

!
|-
| 1967
| rowspan="2"| Tammy Wynette
| Most Promising Female Artist of the Year
| 
| align="center"| 
|-
| 1970
| Female Artist of the Year
| 
| align="center" rowspan="2"| 
|-
| 1980
| "Two Story House"
| Country Hit of the Year 
| 
|-
| 1991
| Tammy Wynette
| Living Legend Award
| 
| align="center"| 
|-
|}

Nashville Songwriters Hall of Fame

!
|-
| 2009
| Tammy Wynette
| Nashville Songwriters Hall of Fame
| 
| align="center"| 
|-
|}

National Association of Recording Merchandisers

!
|-
| 1968
| rowspan="3"| Tammy Wynette
| rowspan="3"| Best-Selling Female Artist
| 
| align="center"| 
|-
| 1969
| 
| align="center"| 
|-
| 1972
| 
| align="center"| 
|-
|}

Record World Awards

!
|-
| 1967
| rowspan="2"| Tammy Wynette
| Most Promising Female Artist of the Year
| 
| align="center"| 
|-
| 1970
| Top Female Artist 
| 
| align="center"| 
|-
|}

References

Wynette, Tammy